The Governor of Bagmati Province is the nominal head of state of the Nepal state (province) of Bagmati Province and a representative of the President of Nepal. The governor is appointed by the term president for a term of five years. The governor's powers are mostly ceremonial and the executive powers of the governor are exercised by the chief minister of Bagmati Province, who is the head of the executive of the state government of Bagmati Province.  The following is a list of governors of Madhesh Province.

The incumbent, Yadav Chandra Sharma, has served as the governor of Bagmati Province since 20 August 2021.

List 
Following is the list of governors of Bagmati Province since its inception on 2018

See also 

 Governor (Nepal)
 Chief Minister of Bagmati Province
 Governor of Koshi Province
 Governor of Madhesh Province
 Speaker of the Bagmati Provincial
 Deputy Speaker of the Bagmati Provincial Assembly 
 Minister for Social Development (Bagmati Province)
 Minister for Physical Infrastructure and Development (Bagmati Province)

Notes

References 

Nepal government-related lists
Nepal politics-related lists
Provinces of Nepal-related lists